A partial lunar eclipse took place on Thursday, March 12, 1914.

Visibility

Related lunar eclipses

Saros series

Half-Saros cycle
A lunar eclipse will be preceded and followed by solar eclipses by 9 years and 5.5 days (a half saros). This lunar eclipse is related to two annular solar eclipses of Solar Saros 138.

See also
List of lunar eclipses
List of 20th-century lunar eclipses

Notes

External links

1914-03
1914 in science
March 1914 events